Proctor High School is a 912 secondary school in Proctor, Minnesota, United States that was established in 1912.

Situated in the Duluth–Superior area, Proctor High School and the connected A.I. Jedlicka Middle School serves about 1,000 students. The Proctor school district contains five schools and they generally have eighteen students for every full-time teacher according to a study done in 2011.

Clubs
Proctor High school offers sports and clubs such as Choir, Cheer-leading, Baseball, Spanish and Nordic Skiing. The activities director is currently Anthony Wood. Clubs include:

 American football
 Band
 Choir
 Drama
 Golf
 Knowledge bowl
 Math team
 Nordic skiing
 School newspaper
 Soccer
 Swimming, girls
 Track and field
 Cross country
 Basketball
 Hockey
 Dungeons and Dragons

Athletic achievements
State Tournament Appearances

Boys
Baseball – 1976, 2011, 2012, 2016
2012 State Class AA Third Place Champions
Basketball – 1964, 1972
State Tournament Individual Records
Most Rebounds, Tournament (3 games): 69, 1964
Most Rebounds, Single Game: 32, 1964
Best Free Throw Percentage, single game: 1.000 (11-11), 1972'
Cross Country Running – 1968, 1982, 1983, 1986, 1987, 1988, 2012, 2013, 2014, 2015
State Meet Individual Champions: Garry Bjorklund, 1968; 2012
American football – 1985, 1991, 1998, 2006, 2007, 2008, 2013, 2015
Hockey – 1997
1997 State Class A Tournament Leading Scorer: 3 goals, 7 assists, 10 points
Soccer – 1999, 2002, 2010
Tennis – Singles Champion: 1938
Track and field
State Meet All-Time Record: One Mile Run – 4:05.10, Garry Bjorklund, 1969
2016 State Class A 100-meter dash champion: 11:19 Terrance Wenzel

Girls
Basketball – 1980, 2001
Cross country running – 1978, 1979, 1980, 1982, 1983, 1984, 1985, 2003
Soccer – 1998, 1999
Softball – 2006
Hockey - 2010 (as Proctor/Hermantown/Marshall School), 2014 (as Proctor/Hermantown), 2016 (as Proctor/Hermantown)

Notable alumni
Dan Devine - head football coach at Missouri, Arizona State, Notre Dame and for the Green Bay Packers.
Garry Bjorklund - runner, holds high school State Meet record for the one-mile run, marathon runner, Olympic runner, Grandma's Half-Marathon is named in his honor.
Scott Jurek - runner, six-time defending champion of the Western States 100 Mile Endurance Run, ultra running's premiere 100 Mile event.
Gena Lee Nolin - actress and model, best known for her television appearances on The Price Is Right and Baywatch in the 1990s; moved from Proctor while in junior high school.
John Ward - Minnesota state representative of District 12A
Tom MacLeod - professional American football player
Dick Pesonen - professional American football player
Ryan DeLuca - professional software engineer

References

External links
 

Educational institutions established in 1912
Public high schools in Minnesota
Schools in St. Louis County, Minnesota
1912 establishments in Minnesota